Algérie Ferries or Entreprise Nationale de Transport Maritime de Voyageurs (ENTMV) is a state-owned Algerian shipping company. The company operates passenger and freight services between Algeria, France and Spain.

Routes
Algérie Ferries operates eight routes across the Mediterranean Sea.

Oran - Alicante
Oran - Marseille
Algiers - Alicante
Algiers - Barcelona
Algiers - Marseille
Béjaïa - Marseille
Skikda - Marseille
Annaba - Marseille

Fleet
Algérie Ferries operates a fleet of five passenger / car ferries:

References

Ferry companies of Algeria
Government-owned companies of Algeria
Transport companies established in 1987
1987 establishments in Algeria